Antoine Bauza  (born 25 August 1978) is a French game designer. He designs board games, role-playing games and video games as well as being an author of children's books.

Life and career 
Bauza was born on 25 August 1978. As a teenager, he was very interested in role-playing games, and wanted to become a video game designer. However, Bauza decided not to pursue video games as a career because he did not want to move away to Shanghai or Montreal, where video game companies were hiring at the time. He instead decided to become a teacher. After reconnecting with friends who started to hold their own game nights, Bauza began making his first board game prototypes in 2003 during his free time while studying at the Institut Universitaire de Formation des Maîtres.

An avid board game player, Bauza decided to start making board games in 2007. In 2010, he began working on board games full-time.

Board games 
 Chabyrinthe
 Draftosaurus
 Ghost Stories
 Hurry’Cup 
 Bakong
 Pocket Rockets
 Monster Chase!
 Pony Express
 Hanabi
 7 Wonders
 7 Wonders Duel
 Rockband Manager
 Mystery Express
 Dojo
 Dr. Shark
 Witty Pong
 Takenoko
 Ali
 Tokaido
 The Little Prince: Make Me a Planet
 Terror in Meeple City
 Samurai Spirit
 Victorian Masterminds
 Welcome back to the dungeon
Last Bastion

Role-playing games 
 Exil
 Final Frontier
 Little Wizards

Video games 
 Furry Tales
 World of Lovecraft

Awards 
 Meeples' Choice Award (2010) for 7 Wonders
 Deutscher Spiele Preis (2011) for 7 Wonders
 Kennerspiel des Jahres (2011) for 7 Wonders
 As d'or Jeu de l'année (2012) for Takenoko
 Spiel des Jahres (2013) for Hanabi
 Fairplay À la carte Award (2013) for Hanabi

References

External links 
 Antoine Bauza's designer page at BoardGameGeek
 Antoine Bauza's designer page at RPGGeek
 Antoine Bauza's website
 Interview with Antoine Bauza (Little Metal Dog)
 Interview with Antoine Bauza (Meeple Town)
 Designer Spotlight: Antoine Bauza

Board game designers
Living people
1978 births
French game designers